Commerce is a Mississippi River village in Scott County, Missouri, United States.  The population was 67 at the time of the 2010 census.

History
In 1788, the present site of Commerce was first occupied by French settlers, making Commerce apparently the third-oldest present site settlement in Missouri after St Louis and St. Charles. A trading post established in 1803 served as the center of commerce for the region, hence the name of the settlement. In 1823, the circuit court ordered a board of commissioners to be appointed to lay out lots here. From 1864 to 1878, Commerce was the county seat of Scott County. Commerce was one of the few areas in Scott County to have uninterrupted mail service during the Civil War, as guerilla bands elsewhere made delivery unsafe for the northern carriers. Commerce, along with the German settlement of New Hamburg, were the two enclaves of Union sympathizers in Scott County during the war. On November 1, 1861, Colonel Oglesby landed in Commerce with about 3,000 men, where his soldiers soon exchanged shots with M. Jeff Thompson. On December 29, 1861, Thompson raided Commerce. On February 21, 1862, General Pope landed here with 140 troops, but when he left a week later his force consisted of 26,153 men. The island in front of Commerce was known as Cat Island at least as early as Mark Twain's time; however, it has been absorbed by Powers Island to the south. Commerce was a Methodist town, with a congregation established as early as 1825 and without a Baptist church until 1906.

Geography
Commerce is located at  (37.157131, -89.446512).

Demographics

2010 census
As of the census of 2010, there were 67 people, 30 households, and 18 families living in the village. The racial makeup of the village was 92.54% White and 7.46% Black or African American.

There were 30 households, of which 23.3% had children under the age of 18 living with them, 56.7% were married couples living together, 3.3% had a female householder with no husband present, and 40.0% were non-families. 36.7% of all households were made up of individuals, and 26.7% had someone living alone who was 65 years of age or older. The average household size was 2.23 and the average family size was 2.94.

The median age in the village was 46.5 years. 19.4% of residents were under the age of 18; 12.1% were between the ages of 18 and 24; 16.5% were from 25 to 44; 29.8% were from 45 to 64; and 22.4% were 65 years of age or older. The gender makeup of the village was 56.7% male and 43.3% female.

2000 census
As of the census of 2000, there were 110 people, 42 households, and 30 families living in the village. The population density was 344.0 people per square mile (132.7/km2). There were 49 housing units at an average density of 153.3 per square mile (59.1/km2). The racial makeup of the village was 96.36% White, 2.73% African American, 0.91% from other races. Hispanic or Latino of any race were 1.82% of the population.

There were 42 households, out of which 33.3% had children under the age of 18 living with them, 64.3% were married couples living together, 7.1% had a female householder with no husband present, and 26.2% were non-families. 26.2% of all households were made up of individuals, and 14.3% had someone living alone who was 65 years of age or older. The average household size was 2.62 and the average family size was 3.13.

In the village the population was spread out, with 26.4% under the age of 18, 8.2% from 18 to 24, 25.5% from 25 to 44, 29.1% from 45 to 64, and 10.9% who were 65 years of age or older. The median age was 38 years. For every 100 females, there were 111.5 males. For every 100 females age 18 and over, there were 102.5 males.

The median income for a household in the village was $36,667, and the median income for a family was $48,750. Males had a median income of $33,125 versus $16,607 for females. The per capita income for the village was $17,552. There were no families and 4.3% of the population living below the poverty line, including no under eighteens and 28.6% of those over 64.

References

Cities in Missouri
Cities in Scott County, Missouri
Missouri populated places on the Mississippi River